Carol Nixon is President of Utah Families Foundation, Utah Arts Council director and the first female to serve as chief of staff to a Utah governor.  She is the wife of William L. Nixon.

References

Living people
Women arts administrators
Year of birth missing (living people)